Lakewood Terminal is a regional  bus terminal owned and operated by NJ Transit (NJT) at 1st & Lexington Avenues in Lakewood, New Jersey. Bus service includes routes to Atlantic City, Hudson County, New York, Philadelphia, and points at the Jersey Shore, including those of the Ocean County bus network, Ocean Ride. It is situated near the intersection of Route 88 and U.S. Route 9, a busy commuter corridor and the former Central Railroad of New Jersey right-of-way, where the MOM rail line may eventually travel. There are 92 parking spaces available at the bus station.

Service

History
Lakewood in the late 19th and early 20th century was a winter resort. Train service by what became New Jersey Southern Railroad began in 1860. Between 1929 and 1941 it was served by CNJ's deluxe Blue Comet service. Weekday passenger service ended in 1952 and weekend passenger service in 1957.

The Lincoln Bus Terminal, as the terminal was originally called, was built in 1950 by Lincoln Stages Bus Company with a bus depot later added. The company, which became Lincoln Transit, ran the Atlantic City-New York route and ceased operations in 1983. The terminal was also used by Greyhound Lines and Public Service Coordinated Transport, the latter of which became Transport of New Jersey and was taken over by New Jersey Transit bus operations (NJT) in 1983. A half-million dollar renovation of the facility by NJT was completed in January 1989.

Express service between New York City and Atlantic City (and points south) now stops at Toms River on NJT 319.

Future
Northern Ocean County, New Jersey borders both Monmouth and Middlesex and is sometimes considered part of larger Central Jersey region. Lakewood saw major population growth between 1990 and 2020 and is now the 5th largest municipality in the state by population at 135,000. Neighboring Toms River is 8th largest at 95,000.

Route 9 BBS
U.S. Route 9 is an important transport corridor for the region. A  section in Old Bridge currently supports a bus bypass shoulder (BBS) during peak hours, and is one of the earliest examples of bus rapid transit in New Jersey. There are plan to extend the BBS
an additional 17 miles south to nearby the Lakewood Bus Terminal. A $588 million project for expansion of the 7.2 mile segment of Route 9 in Lakewood and Toms River as of 2011 was in a "design concept" phase and funding is earmarked for 2016–2017 construction. Studies are also being conducted for the middle section of the BBS in the vicinity of Freehold Township.

MOM
While there was discussion of restoring train service in the 1990s at the time it was decided to add more buses along Route 9. Nonetheless, in the 2000s studies were conducted to explore the possibility of  providing rail service to the region. Known as the Monmouth Ocean Middlesex Line (MOM) project various alignments were considered as to where the line would join either the Northeast Corridor Line or the North Jersey Coast Line. In 2010 federal funding of $535,000 was given to support an alternatives analysis. The 2009 Lakewood Smart Growth Plan included a new train station, situated nearby the bus terminal.

Lakewood Multi-Modal Facility
Lakewood has developed an additional multi-modal facility at the northern end of downtown at 9th Street and Clifton which acts as the hub for the expanding bus network.

References

External links 
Historical photos

NJ Transit bus stations
Transportation buildings and structures in Ocean County, New Jersey
Surface transportation in Greater New York
Transit hubs serving New Jersey
Bus transportation in New Jersey
Lakewood Township, New Jersey